The Oregon Battle of the Books (OBOB) is a yearly event where students create teams and compete based on content from books selected by a committee. Students form teams of 4-5 students and are responsible for reading about 50 books and remembering contents such as plot, characters, and other relevant questions based on the novels.

Controversial book choice 
When the reading list for the Oregon Battle of the Books 2018–2019 season was announced, it was met with a variety of reactions. The committee responsible for selecting the books students must read in order to compete included the novel George by Alex Gino. The novel follows the struggles of a 10 year old transgender girl named Melissa in the fourth grade. Both the Hermiston school district and the Cascade school district chose not to compete in the Oregon Battle of the Books (commonly known as OBOB) that academic year due to the inclusion of Gino's novel. Few of the OBOB book choices have been controversial and many educators and school districts had varying reactions.

Reactions to George 
Cascade school district superintendent Darin Drill explained the district's choice to not participate in the OBOB competition that year. Drill stated that the district deemed the content contained in the novel as inappropriate for the 3rd-5th graders meant to read the book for the competition. Drill and the rest of the Cascade school board were concerned about certain themes within the novel such as the mention of pornography and the possibility for children to learn how to clear their search history. The statements made by the Hermiston school district and the Cascade school district explicitly stated they were not protesting the inclusion of the novel because of the main character being a transgender girl but because of the other content the book contained. 

As the decisions made by the Hermiston and Cascade school districts spread, parents and OBOB committee members also commented on the situation. One parent expressed her frustration that parents had not been directly involved in the decision to leave the OBOB competition that year. Sara Hernandez, the parent of a student in the Cascade district, stated she was frustrated because the school board had made the decision without parent involvement and hadn't even allowed discussion but instead outright removed themselves from the OBOB competition. The administrative chair of the OBOB committee and a school librarian, Linda Fukasawa, released an email explaining how George was selected as one of the OBOB books and why the committee believed it was appropriate for 3rd grade to 5th grade children. Fukasawa continued to describe the committee's criteria for OBOB novels and stated George was chosen because it displayed diversity with a main character in the same age range as the children meant to read it for the OBOB competition.

The author of the novel, Alex Gino, spoke with New York Daily News to release a statement about the meaning of the novel and why it was appropriate for children. Gino explained that they wanted to explore the theme of being young and queer, specifically young and transgender. As a genderqueer individual, Gino understands some of the struggles the main character Melissa faces throughout the novel and wanted to share that experience with children who are not typically exposed to media containing trans people. Gino also stated that the novel would not cause children to become transgender, but it might be able to comfort young trans kids and help their peers be more accepting of them.

References 

2018 in Oregon
2019 in Oregon
2018 controversies in the United States
2019 controversies in the United States
Book censorship in the United States
LGBT history in Oregon
LGBT-related controversies in literature
Mass media-related controversies in the United States
Transgender history in the United States